WWE Magazine was the official professional wrestling magazine of WWE. This incarnation of the magazine contains lifestyle sections, a monthly calendar, entertainment, work out tips, and other information. It was announced in July 2014 that after thirty years, the magazine would cease production, although special issues would continue to be published.

History
WWE Magazine has gone through many incarnations throughout the years. It was originally known as WWF Victory Magazine from its debut issue in 1983 through the third issue of publication.

Starting with the third issue (April/May 1984) it became known as World Wrestling Federation Magazine (or WWF Magazine for short), with newly crowned WWF World Heavyweight Champion Hulk Hogan on the cover. WWF Magazine would continue to be bi-monthly until June 1987, in which it would become a monthly operation and a staple of the WWF for the next decade. For several years, WWF Magazine operated as a kayfabe magazine; stories included biographies of wrestlers and feuds, as well as previews of upcoming events, editorials, and other features targeted at younger audiences; excerpts from letters to the editor, mainly from fans commenting on the wrestlers and angles, were also published. In April 1996, the WWF decided to create a second magazine called Raw Magazine, which became a focus on behind the scenes activity, focusing on wrestlers real life profiles. It debuted with the May/June 1996 issue, and was bi-monthly until the January 1998 issue. In May 2002, the World Wrestling Federation became known as World Wrestling Entertainment (WWE), and therefore the magazine was changed accordingly to WWE Magazine starting with the June 2002 issue. In 2006, the magazine changed by moving away from being solely a wrestling magazine. Instead the majority of the magazine contained lifestyle tips, product reviews and photos of WWE's superstars and divas outside the ring. The new style was similar to current men's magazines, such as Maxim and Stuff.

On July 31, 2014, it was announced that WWE Magazine would cease production due to budget cuts as well as a decline in circulation. The last issue (October 2014) would be available on September 16, 2014. The final edition of WWE Magazine featured Seth Rollins, Roman Reigns and Dean Ambrose on the cover, former members of The Shield.

Breaking kayfabe
On very rare occasions, kayfabe would be broken; such instances would be if a wrestler had died or if the topic had such far-reaching interest to WWF fans that it could not be ignored. Notable examples of the magazine breaking kayfabe were the 1990 parasailing accident that injured Brutus "the Barber" Beefcake (at the time, one of the WWF's biggest stars), and the 1992 divorce of Randy Savage and Miss Elizabeth.

In the September 1993 issue, the magazine was to introduce a semi-regular feature titled "Now It's Our Turn", which was to present the WWF's official (non-kayfabe) explanations/defenses against accusations from former wrestlers and employees.  Although one lengthy column focusing on Superstar Billy Graham was published, the feature did not appear again.

WWE Kids Magazine
WWE Kids Magazine launched in April 2008 and was a monthly magazine aimed at children aged 6–14. It is still being published in the United Kingdom though the US edition is no longer being published.

See also

WWE Heroes

References

1984 establishments in Connecticut
2014 disestablishments in Connecticut
Bimonthly magazines published in the United States
Sports magazines published in the United States
Professional wrestling magazines
Magazines established in 1984
Magazines disestablished in 2014
Defunct magazines published in the United States
Magazines published in Connecticut
WWE